Ghanaian students who graduate from accredited tertiary institutions are required under law to do a one-year national service to the country. The National Service Secretariat (NSS) is the Government of Ghana agency mandated to formulate policies and structures for national service.

Structure of the NSS

The organogram of the service has the Board of the service at the top. The Board supervises the activities of the Executive Director and two Deputy Executive Directors. One deputy is the Head of Finance and Administration and the other is in charge of the service's operations. The Executive Director and the Deputies supervise the activities of the Heads of various Departments. 
At the regional level, the service is headed by the Regional Director who in turn supervises the work of the various District Directors. The service has Regional Heads in all the ten regional capitals of the country. The service has a staff strength of 342.

Terms of service
All graduates from Ghanaian tertiary institutions must complete a one-year national service. Every year several ten of thousands of graduates are posted to various sectors as service personnel.  In 2009 - 2010 service year, about 67,000 graduates were posted. In the 2010 - 2011 service year, 50,069 personnel were posted.  The service is done irrespective of type of sponsorship the individual may have received or the country in which the tertiary course was pursued in. The personnel upon posting to an establishment is subject to the rules and regulations that govern it. In case where the establishment's rules conflict with that of the NSS, the latter's is used. Again, graduates who are sponsored by certain institutions to offer tertiary programmes return to those institutions. All benefits that the service personnel is entitled to shall be frozen till the personnel complete their service.

Allowance
Service personnel are paid monthly allowances. The amount paid is determined by the Ministry of Finance. The allowance that is approved is what the ministry would pay the personnel throughout the service year. Payment is calculated from the date the service personnel reports for duty at his/her designated post.

Annual leave
All personnel are entitled to a month's annual terminal leave for the year that spans their service. The month leave is usually given in August to all personnel.

National Service Certificate
After completion of the mandatory one-year national service, The National Service Secretariat issues a national service certificate to all personnel.

Offenses under the NSS Act
The NSS is governed by Act 426 under which there are the following offenses:

Evasion
Personnel who do not report to their posts after 3 months of being posted are considered to have evaded the service. For such a personnel, appropriate sanctions under Act 426 are applied.

See also
 National Youth Authority

References

External links
 National Service Secretariat − Ghana National Service Scheme (NSS)

Ministries and Agencies of State of Ghana